"Stray Rounds" is the ninth episode of the second season of the HBO original series The Wire. The episode was written by David Simon from a story by David Simon & Ed Burns and was directed by Tim Van Patten. It originally aired on July 27, 2003.

Plot
The Sobotka detail is dismayed when they realize the smuggling ring has changed their operating procedures. Daniels assigns Herc and Carver to watch the warehouse as Bunk, Freamon, Prez, and Beadie man their remaining wiretaps. McNulty visits Terrence "Fitz" Fitzhugh, his FBI contact, and apologizes for his actions last time they met. Fitz agrees to look into Glekas but finds that his FBI file has been sealed by an Agent Koutris, who is working for the Greek and tips him off about the focus on Glekas. Beadie sees a container go missing and Carver and Herc observe its arrival at the warehouse. Eton Ben-Eleazer, Vondas' lieutenant, orders one of his men to record the license plates of cars nearby. McNulty infiltrates the brothel under his assumed identity of the British john. McNulty engages two prostitutes as he calls for the rest of the team to intervene. When they arrive and arrest the patrons they find McNulty having sex with them. McNulty writes a statement which is witnessed by an aghast Pearlman.

Vondas gently lets Nick know that his small orders of drugs do not require dealing with Eton and Vondas; the latter puts him in touch with White Mike to supply him with drugs and gives him a new list of clean containers to disappear. Vondas and Eton agree to get back to business importing drugs. During dinner, The Greek and his associates discuss the unreliability of their Colombian business partners. For revenge, The Greek leaks details of a huge Colombian cocaine shipment to Koutris, who makes the drug bust. Meanwhile, Bodie's crew is confronted by the competitors they previously chased off the corner. In the ensuing gunfight, a nine-year-old boy is killed by a stray bullet through his bedroom window. Rawls meets Major Howard "Bunny" Colvin and Lieutenant Dennis Mello at the scene of the shooting. Stringer is angry that the drug trade will be disrupted by the killing, and has Bodie and Shamrock dispose of the weapons. However, when they throw the bag of guns over the side of the Hanover Street Bridge, it lands on the deck of a passing barge and is turned over to the police.

Colvin's district conducts a large-scale strike operation against drug dealers. Everyone in the pit is taken into custody in an attempt to glean information about who shot the child. Mello comments that they waited too long to do this, but Colvin asks what it is they think they are actually doing. Cole and Norris question Bodie, presenting the bagged weapons he failed to dispose of. Cole tells him they have matched his prints to a weapon, but Bodie quickly sees through the bluff and asks for his lawyer. Stringer lets Proposition Joe know that he accepts Joe's proposal that they pool their resources and share product and territory, making assurances that Avon will come around to the idea. Stringer asks Brianna to talk to Avon, but he still opposes cooperation with Joe and insists he's working on getting a new supply. He recruits Brother Mouzone, a feared hitman from New York, as muscle against rival dealers. Stringer tries to assure Joe that they have time to put their plan into action before Mouzone arrives, but Joe refuses to send any of his people up against him. Despite Stringer's hope that Mouzone would not arrive for a week or perhaps two, the hitman shows up the next day.

Ziggy drinks with Johnny Fifty and expresses a desire to get out of the drug business. When Nick arrives later, a drunk and distraught Ziggy tries to start a fight with him. In the bar, Nick discovers that Ziggy had accidentally killed his pet duck via alcohol poisoning. Ziggy meets with Glekas and offers him stolen cars from the docks to sell abroad. Glekas is initially reluctant but eventually agrees to give Ziggy a chance since it would be a good deal for him. Ziggy plans to create a track across the grass and a hole in the fence to take the cars through, making the theft look like an outside job.

Production

Title reference
The title refers to the stray bullets from the gunfight one of which killed a nearby child, as well as the 'rounds' of alcohol that poisoned Ziggy's duck. It may also refer to the Greek's straying from their normal business activity by having rounds of clean cans sent, and by Stringer straying from Avon's wishes by using Proposition Joe's raw product sold in his towers. Finally, Lieutenant Daniels and his team 'stray' from the target appointed them by Major Valchek, embarking on a case much wider than was originally conceived.

Epigraph

The Greek makes this statement referring to telecommunication. It also refers to the fact that many of the show's characters are connected to each other, even while being unaware of it.

Credits

Starring cast
Although credited, Wood Harris does not appear in this episode.

Guest stars
Seth Gilliam as Detective Ellis Carver
Domenick Lombardozzi as Detective Thomas "Herc" Hauk
Jim True-Frost as Detective Roland "Prez" Pryzbylewski
Robert Wisdom as Major Howard "Bunny" Colvin
James Ransone as Ziggy Sobotka
Pablo Schreiber as Nick Sobotka
Tom Mardirosian as Agent Koutris
Michael Potts as Brother Mouzone
Bill Raymond as The Greek
Lev Gorens as Eton Ben-Eleazer
Michael Hyatt as Brianna Barksdale
J.D. Williams as Preston "Boadie" Broadus
Tray Chaney as Malik "Poot" Carr
Robert F. Chew as Proposition Joe
Luray Cooper as Nat Coxson
Kelvin Davis as La La
Chris Ashworth as Sergei Malatov
Al Brown as Major Stan Valchek
Doug Olear as Terrance "Fitz" Fitzhugh
Charley Scalies as Thomas "Horseface" Pakusa
Delaney Williams as Sergeant Jay Landsman
Ted Feldman as George "Double G" Glekas
Bus Howard as Vernon "Ott" Mottley
Ed Norris as Ed Norris
Gloria Phillips as bereaved mother

Uncredited appearances
Jay Landsman as Lieutenant Dennis Mello
Brook Yeaton as "White" Mike McArdle
De'Rodd Hearns as Puddin
Richard Burton as Shamrock
Jeffrey Pratt Gordon as Johnny "Fifty" Spamanto
Derren M. Fuentes as Lieutenant Torret
Gil Deeble as Hucklebuck
Gordana Rashovich as Ilona Petrovich
Daniel Ferro as Police Officer
Luke Montgomery III as young boy
Randall Boffman as Bill Anderson - administrator for the port of Baltimore
Jonas Grey as drug buyer

First appearances
Howard "Bunny" Colvin: Commander of the Western District, seen at the scene of the child's shooting.
Dennis Mello: Shift lieutenant in the Western District and Colvin's right-hand man.
Brother Mouzone: New York hitman and drug enforcer who appears in a manner similar to Nation of Islam members.

Miscellaneous
Robert F. Colesberry makes his final appearance as Detective Ray Cole in this episode. Colesberry died in 2004 following complications from cardiac surgery.

Jimmy McNulty struggles with an English accent and vernacular in this episode, although actor Dominic West is in fact English.

References

External links
"Stray Rounds" at HBO.com

The Wire (season 2) episodes
2003 American television episodes
Television episodes written by David Simon
Television episodes directed by Tim Van Patten